Imperial Noble Consort Dunsu (after 1679 - 23 December 1725), of the Han Chinese Bordered Yellow Banner Nian clan, was a consort of the Yongzheng Emperor.

Life

Family background
Imperial Noble Consort Dunsu's personal name was not recorded in history.

 Father: Xialing, served as the governor of Huguang, and held the title of a first class duke
 Five elder brothers
 Fifth elder brother: Gengyao (1679–1726)
 One sister

Kangxi era
The date of birth of the future Imperial Noble Consort Dunsu is unknown. She entered the Forbidden City in 1711, and became a secondary consort (側福晉) to Yinzhen, the future Yongzheng Emperor. On 15 April 1715, she gave birth to her first child, a daughter, who died at the age of two in June or July 1717. On 30 June 1720, she gave birth to her second child, a son, Fuyi (福宜), who died on 9 February 1721. On 27 November 1721, she gave birth to her third child, a son, Fuhui (福惠), who died on 11 October 1728.

Yongzheng era
The Kangxi Emperor died, and Yongzheng ascended the throne on 27 December 1722. On 28 March 1723, she was given the title of "Noble Consort" (貴妃). On 12 June 1723, she gave birth to her fourth child, a son, Fupei (福沛). On 19 December 1725, she was elevated to "Imperial Noble Consort" (皇貴妃). She died on 27 December 1725, and was given the posthumous title of "Imperial Noble Consort Dunsu" (敦肅皇貴妃). She was interred in the Tai Mausoleum of the Western Qing tombs.

Titles
 During the reign of the Kangxi Emperor (r. 1661–1722):
 Lady Nian (年氏)
 Secondary Consort (from 1711)
 During the reign of the Yongzheng Emperor (r. 1722–1735):
 Noble Consort Nian (from 28 March 1723), third rank consort
 Imperial Noble Consort (from 19 December 1725), second rank consort
 Imperial Noble Consort Dunsu (from December 1725)

Issue
 As Lord Consort Nian:
 The Yongzheng Emperor's fourth daughter (15 April 1715 – June/July 1717)
 Fuyi (30 June 1720 – 9 February 1721), the Yongzheng Emperor's seventh son
 Fuhui (27 November 1721 – 11 October 1728), the Yongzheng Emperor's eighth son
 As Noble Consort Nian:
 Fupei (12 June 1723), the Yongzheng Emperor's ninth son

In fiction and popular culture
 Portrayed by Pao Cheng-Fang in Legend of YungChing (1997)
 Portrayed by Chang Lin in Yongzheng Dynasty (1999)
 Portrayed by Tong Liya in Palace (2011)
 Portrayed by Lu Meifang in Scarlet Heart (2011)
 Portrayed by Jiang Xin in Empresses in the Palace (2011)
 Portrayed by Nancy Wu in Gilded Chopsticks (2014)
 Portrayed by Li Sha Min Zi in Love in The Imperial Palace (2017)

See also
 Ranks of imperial consorts in China#Qing
 Royal and noble ranks of the Qing dynasty

Notes

References
 

17th-century births
1725 deaths
17th-century Chinese women
17th-century Chinese people
18th-century Chinese women
18th-century Chinese people
Consorts of the Yongzheng Emperor